The WGC Screenwriting Awards (previously Canadian Screenwriting Awards) are administered by the Writers Guild of Canada, and are awarded to the best script for a feature film, television or radio project produced within the Guild's jurisdiction, written by a guild member in good standing, and broadcast or released in North America or screened at a Canadian film festival for the first time in the previous year.

In addition to the film, television and radio categories, special awards presented by the WGC include the Sondra Kelly Award for projects written by women, the Denis McGrath Service Award for distinguished contributions to the organization, and the Jim Burt Screenwriting Prize for the best unproduced new screenplay.

Awards

2006
Children & Preschool — Mary Crawford and Alan Templeton, King: "Stolen Voices"
Comedy & Variety — Brent Butt and Paul Mather, Corner Gas: "Dog River Vice"
Documentary — Robert Duncan, Woodward's: The Competition
Drama, Half-Hour — Susin Nielsen, Robson Arms: "Dancing the Horizontal Mambo"
Drama, One Hour — Susan Coyne, Bob Martin and Mark McKinney, Slings & Arrows: "Steeped in Blood"
Feature Film — Wil Zmak, The Dark Hours
Radio Drama — Jason Sherman, Graf: "Episode 1"
Youth — Jeff Biederman, Life with Derek: "The Party"
Alex Barris Mentorship Award — Josh Miller
Jim Burt Screenwriting Prize — Jason Hreno, Two Mountains
Writers Block Award — Fred Yackman

2007
Children & Preschool — Kate Barris, If the World Were a Village
Comedy & Variety — Brent Butt and Kevin White, Corner Gas: "Outside Joke"
Documentary — Barry Stevens, The Bomber's Dream
Drama, Half-Hour — Laura Kosterski, Naked Josh: "Beating the Rap"
Drama, One Hour — Susan Coyne, Bob Martin and Mark McKinney, Slings & Arrows: "That Way Madness Lies"
Feature Film — Sarah Polley, Away from Her
MOW & Miniseries — John W. Doyle and Lisa Porter, Above and Beyond
Radio Drama — Andrew Moodie, Greg Nelson, Adam Pettle and Jason Sherman, Afghanada: "Episode 4"
Youth — Brent Piaskoski, Naturally Sadie: "Rashomon"
Showrunner Award — Brad White
Jim Burt Screenwriting Prize — Ryan Redford, Bone
Writers Block Award — Sondra Kelly, Sugith Varughese

2008
Children & Preschool — Kenn Scott, Iggy Arbuckle: "Petition Impossible"
Documentary — Barri Cohen, Toxic Trespass
Drama Series, Half-Hour — Mark Farrell and Robert Sheridan, Corner Gas: "Seeing Things"
Drama Series, One Hour — Denis McGrath and Robert Wertheimer, Across the River to Motor City: "Happy Birthday, Mr. President"
Feature Film — Travis McDonald, Normal
MOW or Miniseries — Ian Weir, Dragon Boys
Radio Drama — Jason Sherman, Adam Pettle and Greg Nelson, Afghanada: "Episode 12"
Variety — Kevin White, Mark Critch, Irwin Barker, Gavin Crawford, Gary Pearson, Jennifer Whalen, Carolyn Taylor, Albert Howell, Dave Nystrom, Geri Hall, Todd Allen and Tim McAuliffe, This Hour Has 22 Minutes: "Season XIV, Episode 17"
Youth — Brent Piaskoski, Naturally Sadie: "In or Out of Africa"
WGC Showrunner Award — Peter Mohan
Jim Burt Screenwriting Prize — Tony Elliott, Stranger Than You
Alex Barris Mentorship Award — Allan Magee
WGC Writers Block Award — Jack Blum, Jeremy Hole and Ann MacNaughton

2009
Animation — Shane Simmons, Ricky Sprocket: Showbiz Boy: "The Perfect Family"
Children & Preschool — Christin Simms, Captain Flamingo: "Comic Slip"
Documentary — John Walker, Passage
Episodic, Half-Hour — Brent Butt, Corner Gas: "Full Load"
Episodic, One Hour — Adam Barken, Flashpoint: "Who's George?"
Feature Film — Don McKellar, Blindness
MOW & Miniseries — Andrew Wreggitt, Mayerthorpe
Radio Drama — Greg Spottiswood, Afghanada: "The Lotus Eater"
Short Film — Kellie Ann Benz, Awkward
Variety — Mark Critch, Gavin Crawford, Kyle Tingley, Jennifer Whalen, Albert Howell, Tim McAuliffe, Dean Jenkinson, Geri Hall and Nathan Fielder, This Hour Has 22 Minutes: "Season XVI, Episode 1"
Youth — Brent Piaskoski, The Latest Buzz: "The Gala Issue"
Showrunner Award — Mark Farrell
Jim Burt Screenwriting Prize — Riley Adams, Cold Rush
Writers Block Award — Karen Walton

2010
Animation — Shelley Scarrow, Total Drama Action: "The Sand Witch Project"
Children & Preschool — Kate Barris, Max & Ruby: "Max Says Goodbye"
Documentary — Robert Lower, The Royal Winnipeg Ballet: 40 Years of One Night Stands
Episodic, Half-Hour — Garry Campbell, Less Than Kind: "The Daters"
Episodic, One Hour — Robert C. Cooper, Stargate Universe: "Time"
Feature Film — Jacob Tierney, The Trotsky
MOW & Miniseries — John Krizanc, The Summit
Radio Drama — Barbara Samuels, Afghanada: "Episode 61"
Short Subject — Jessie Gabe, Being Erica: "Webisodes"
Variety — Ed Macdonald, Mark Critch, Gavin Crawford, Kyle Tingley, Albert Howell, Dean Jenkinson, Joanne O’Sullivan, Tara Doyle, Erik van Wyck, Mike Allison and Joey Case, This Hour Has 22 Minutes: "Season XVII, Episode 6"
Youth — Anita Kapila, How to Be Indie: "How to Be a Mehta"
Alex Barris Mentorship Award — Peter Mitchell
Showrunner Award — Heather Conkie
Writers Block Award — Rebecca Schechter

2011
Animation — Karen Moonah, The Cat in the Hat Knows a Lot About That!: "The Cat in the Hat Knows a Lot About Maps"
Children & Youth — Barbara Haynes, The Latest Buzz: "The Extreme Shakespeare Issue"
Comedy — Chris Sheasgreen, Less Than Kind: "Coming Home"
Documentary — Christine Nielsen, The Pig Farm
Drama — Mark Ellis and Stephanie Morgenstern, Flashpoint: "Jumping at Shadows"
Feature Film — Michael Konyves, Barney's Version
Shorts & Webseries — Lisa Hunter, You Are So Undead
Showrunner Award — Tassie Cameron
Jim Burt Screenwriting Prize — Denise Blinn, 1936
Writers Block Award — Peter Grant

2012
Animation — Darrin Rose, Scaredy Squirrel: "Nothing But the Tooth"
Children & Youth — Alice Prodanou, My Babysitter's a Vampire: "ReVamped"
Comedy — Craig David Wallace, Todd and the Book of Pure Evil: "A Farewell to Curtis' Arm"
Documentary — Gary Marcuse, Waking the Green Tiger: A Green Movement Rises in China
Drama — Larry Bambrick, Flashpoint: "Shockwave"
Movies & Miniseries — Bruce Smith, John A.: Birth of a Country
Shorts & Webseries — Patrick Tarr, Murdoch Mysteries: The Curse of the Lost Pharaohs
Showrunner Award — Mark McKinney
Alex Barris Mentorship Award — Barbara Samuels
Writers Block Award — Chuck Lazer

2013
Animation — Dan Williams and Lienne Sawatsky, Sidekick: "I, Sidebot"
Children & Youth — John May and Suzanne Bolch, How to Be Indie: "How to Make a Christmas Miracle"
Comedy — Kim Coghill, Less Than Kind: "Jerk Chicken"
Documentary — Mitch Miyagawa, A Sorry State
Drama — Martin Gero, The L.A. Complex: "Down in L.A."
Movies & Miniseries — Andrew Wreggitt, The Phantoms
Shorts & Webseries — Julie Strassman-Cohn and Jill Golick, Ruby Skye P.I.: The Haunted Library: "#Creepy"
Showrunner Award — Mark Ellis, Stephanie Morgenstern
Jim Burt Screenwriting Prize — Adam Garnet Jones, Wild Medicine
Writers Block Award — Anne-Marie Perrotta, Simon Racioppa, Lienne Sawatsky

2014
Animation — Hollis Ludlow-Carroll, Almost Naked Animals: "The Rotation Situation"
Children & Youth — Lisa Hunter, Finding Stuff Out: "Babies and Families" and Cole Bastedo, Mr. Young: "Mr. Love Letter"
Comedy — Marvin Kaye and Chris Sheasgreen, Less Than Kind: "I'm Only Nineteen"
Documentary — Barry Stevens, Sector Sarajevo
Drama — Will Pascoe, Orphan Black: "Variations Under Domestication"
Movies & Miniseries — Elan Mastai, The F Word
Shorts & Webseries — Jill Golick and Julie Strassman, Ruby Skye P.I.: The Haunted Library: "The Final Clue"
Alex Barris Mentorship Award — Susin Nielsen
Showrunner Award — Peter Mitchell
Writers Block Award — Maureen Parker

2015
Animation — Simon Racioppa and Richard Elliott, Fangbone!: "The Warbrute of Friendship"
Children & Youth — Melody Fox, The Haunting Hour: The Series: "Mrs. Worthington"
Comedy — Andrew De Angelis, Mr. D: "Old School"
Documentary — Michael McNamara, The Cholesterol Question
Drama — Tony Elliott, Orphan Black: "Ipsa Scientia Potestas Est"
Movies & Miniseries — Nicolas Billon, Elephant Song
Shorts & Webseries — Jason Leaver, Out with Dad: "Outed"
Showrunner Award — Bruce Smith
Sondra Kelly Award — Alison Lea Bingeman
Writers Block Award — Denis McGrath

2016
Children — Evan Thaler Hickey, Numb Chucks: "Witless to the Prosecution"
Comedy — Amanda Walsh, Schitt's Creek: "The Cabin"
Documentary — Josh Freed, Deluged by Data
Drama — Russ Cochrane, Orphan Black: "Newer Elements of Our Defense"
Feature Film — James Kee, Sarah Larsen, Doug Taylor and Pascal Trottier, A Christmas Horror Story
MOW & Miniseries — Clement Virgo and Lawrence Hill, The Book of Negroes
Shorts & Webseries — Michael Konyves, Goldfish
Tweens & Teens — Jennica Harper, Some Assembly Required: "Rocket with a Pocket"
Showrunner Award — Frank van Keeken
Sondra Kelly Award — Penny Gummerson
Writers Block Award — Peter Mohan
Alex Barris Mentorship Award — Clive Endersby

2017
Best New Series Script — Alexandra Zarowny, Wynonna Earp: "Bury Me with My Guns On"
Children's — Tim McKeon, Odd Squad: "Drop Gadget Repeat" 
Comedy — Jared Keeso and Jacob Tierney, Letterkenny: "Super Soft Birthday"
Documentary — John Walker, Quebec My Country Mon Pays
Drama — Mark Ellis and Stephanie Morgenstern, X Company: "August 19th"
Feature Film — Sherry White, Maudie
MOW & Miniseries — Adam Barken, Bruno & Boots: Go Jump in the Pool
Tweens & Teens — Ian MacIntyre, Degrassi: Next Class: "#TeamFollowBack"
Sondra Kelly Award — Diana Frances
Jim Burt Screenwriting Prize — Daniel Whidden, Valhalla
Showrunner Award — Aaron Martin
Denis McGrath Award — Andrew Wreggitt

2018
Best New Series Script — Moira Walley-Beckett, Anne with an E: "I Am No Bird, and No Net Ensnares Me"
Children's — Sean Jara, Mysticons: "Sisters in Arms"
Comedy — Jared Keeso and Jacob Tierney, Letterkenny: "Relationships"
Documentary — Mark Leiren-Young, The Hundred-Year-Old Whale
Drama — Aubrey Nealon, Cardinal: "John Cardinal"
Feature Film — Jason Filiatrault, Entanglement
MOW & Miniseries — Sarah Polley, Alias Grace: "Part 5"
Shorts & Webseries — Karen McClellan, Spiral: "The Girl in the Dream"
Tweens & Teens — Matt Kippen, The Stanley Dynamic: "The Stanley Cheer"
Showrunner Award — Michael MacLennan
Alex Barris Mentorship Award — Sherry White
Sondra Kelly Award — Sarah Dodd

2019
Best New Series Script — Daegan Fryklind, The Bletchley Circle: San Francisco: "Presidio"
Children's — Josh Sager, Jerome Simpson, Wishfart: "I Wear This Hat Ironically"
Comedy — Rupinder Gill, Schitt's Creek: "RIP Moira Rose"
Documentary —  Michael McNamara, Catwalk: Tales from the Cat Show Circuit
Drama — Sarah Dodd, Cardinal: Blackfly Season: "Red"
Feature Film — Jeremy Boxen, 22 Chaser
MOW & Miniseries — Tim McKeon, Odd Squad: World Turned Odd
Shorts & Webseries — Alex Epstein and Lisa Hunter, We’ve Come to the End of Our Time
Tweens & Teens — Cole Bastedo, Star Falls: "The Picnic Auction"
Sondra Kelly Award — Jinder Oujla-Chalmers
Jim Burt Screenwriting Prize — Pat Holden, Mirsada and Amir Kahnamouee, Harbour House
Showrunner Award — Emily Andras
McGrath Service Award — Bruce Smith

2020
Children — Mark Steinberg, Hotel Transylvania: The Series: "Better Know Your Mavis"
Comedy — Jann Arden and Jennica Harper, Jann: "The Big House"
Documentary — Nance Ackerman, Ariella Pahlke and Teresa MacInnes, Conviction
Drama Series — Noelle Carbone, Coroner: "All's Well"
Feature Film — Laura Phillips, Sweetness in the Belly
MOW & Miniseries — David Elver and Andrea Stevens, Thicker Than Water
Preschool — J. J. Johnson, Christin Simms and Amish Patel, Dino Dana: "Dino Prints"
Shorts & Webseries — Fab Filippo, Save Me: "Birdie's End"
Tweens & Teens — Emma Campbell, Creeped Out: "The Takedown"
Sondra Kelly Award — Cynthia Knight
Alex Barris Mentorship Award — Nathalie Younglai
Showrunner Award — Dennis Heaton

2021
Children — Mark De Angelis, Odd Squad Mobile Unit: "Slow Your Roll"
Comedy — Daniel Levy, Schitt's Creek: "Happy Ending"
Documentary — Jonny Harris, Fraser Young, Graham Chittenden and Steve Dylan, Still Standing: "Rankin Inlet"
Drama — Michelle Latimer, Tony Elliott and Penny Gummerson, Trickster: "Episode 105"
Feature Film — Tracey Deer and Meredith Vuchnich, Beans
MOW & Miniseries — Becky Southwell and Dylan Neal, Gourmet Detective: Roux the Day
Preschool — J. J. Johnson, Dino Dana: "The Sound of Dinosaurs"
Shorts & Webseries — Simone Swan and The Affolter Brothers, Try to Fly
Tweens & Teens — Joseph Mallozzi and R. T. Thorne, Utopia Falls: "The World Is Yours"
Sondra Kelly Award — Kate Hewlett
Jim Burt Screenwriting Prize — Travis McDonald, Magnificent
Showrunner Award — Morwyn Brebner

2022
Children's — Lakna Edilima, Odd Squad Mobile Unit: "H2 Oh No"
Comedy — Bilal Baig and Fab Filippo, Sort Of: "Sort of Gone"
Drama — Tassie Cameron and Sherry White, Pretty Hard Cases: "Bananas"
Feature Film — Michael McGowan, All My Puny Sorrows
MOW & Miniseries — James Phillips, As Gouda As It Gets
Preschool — Michael Foulke, Elinor Wonders Why: "Olive's Tree"
Shorts & Webseries — Maddi Patton, My Pride: The Series: "Fire"
Tweens & Teens — Amanda Joy, The Parker Andersons/Amelia Parker: "Joy"
Sondra Kelly Award — Carolyn Saunders
Alex Barris Mentorship Award — Matt Huether
Denis McGrath Award — Michael Amo
Showrunner Award — Anthony Q. Farrell

See also

 Canadian television awards

References

External links

Canadian film awards
Canadian television awards
Screenwriting awards for film
Screenwriting awards for television